Finn (Designation FN-2187) is a fictional character in the Star Wars franchise.  The character first appeared in the 2015 film The Force Awakens as a First Order stormtrooper who, shocked by the Order's cruelty in his first combat mission, flees and joins forces with Rey and later the Resistance. He is portrayed by English actor John Boyega, who reprised the role in The Last Jedi and The Rise of Skywalker. Boyega's performance and the character have received praise. For his performance in The Force Awakens, Boyega won the BAFTA Rising Star Award and was nominated for the Saturn Award for Best Actor.

Casting and creation
The idea for the character, whose name during early pre-production was Sam, came from screenwriter Lawrence Kasdan. Colleague Michael Arndt, who prepared an early draft of The Force Awakens, said: And then we were struggling to figure out who the male lead was going to be. I remember we talked about pirates and merchant marines and all this stuff, and finally Larry [Kasdan] got pissed at all of us and he's just like, "You guys, you're not thinking big. What if he's a stormtrooper that ran away?"

For the roles of Finn and other new Star Wars characters for The Force Awakens, director J. J. Abrams intentionally looked for unknown actors, as he wanted audiences "to meet these characters [in the film] and not feel like it’s him from that thing, it’s her from that thing." Boyega, who had impressed Abrams in his debut role in the British sci-fi film Attack the Block (2011), was invited to audition for the role of Finn, a process which lasted seven months before he was finally cast. Kathleen Kennedy, one of the producers of The Force Awakens, stated: John Boyega was somebody we'd known of because of Attack the Block. And we'd been sort of putting him on the top of our list right from the beginning. But, then again, we went on a massive search just to see who was out there, and we kept coming back to realizing that John would be the perfect Finn.

Finn's stormtrooper code name, FN-2187, is a reference to the number of the cell in which Princess Leia was detained in the original 1977 film Star Wars. "Cell 2187", in turn, references Arthur Lipsett's short film 21-87.

Abrams stated that it was intentional that Finn was given no last name in promotional materials for The Force Awakens, suggesting that his full name and background would be revealed in future films. However, the film itself revealed that "Finn" is an adopted name, derived from his stormtrooper number.
In 2021 whilst promoting the film Cherry, Marvel Cinematic Universe actor Tom Holland revealed he had also auditioned for the role of Finn before Boyega was cast.

Appearances

The Force Awakens
Finn, originally designated "FN-2187", is an ex-First Order stormtrooper who served under Captain Phasma (Gwendoline Christie) and Kylo Ren (Adam Driver). He was taken from his family at a young age and sold to the First Order to become a part of their ever-expanding army. He was trained for most his life to be an effective, loyal, and merciless soldier.

In spite of his training, Finn becomes disillusioned with the First Order during his first combat mission on the planet Jakku. He is traumatized when a fellow stormtrooper dies in front of him, and is later horrified when Ren, having failed to secure the map that will lead to the missing Luke Skywalker (Mark Hamill), orders his squadron to massacre a village of Jakku civilians. The other stormtroopers follow Ren's order without hesitation. Finn, however, lowers his weapon, aghast, in a silent but firm refusal. While on Jakku, Phasma and Ren both notice Finn's inability to kill, and Phasma later instructs him to report for reconditioning to better follow her orders. Instead of heeding her word, Finn resolves to flee the First Order, and convinces the captured Resistance pilot Poe Dameron (Oscar Isaac) to aid him in his escape.

With Poe piloting a stolen TIE fighter, the two escape from aboard the Finalizer—the Resurgent-class Star Destroyer where Poe was being held prisoner. While piloting, Poe dubs FN-2187 "Finn" (from the "FN" in his designation), which the otherwise nameless stormtrooper embraces. Moments after, their TIE fighter is shot down by the Finalizer's turrets and crash-lands back on Jakku. When Finn comes to, he searches for Poe in the wreckage, but is only able to find the pilot's jacket before the shattered hull of their ship is swallowed by an enormous sinkhole. Finn assumes that Poe is dead. Alone, Finn decides to search for civilization, and dons Poe's jacket in place of his own stormtrooper armor.

Poe's astromech droid BB-8, now in the care of the junk scavenger Rey (Daisy Ridley), recognizes the jacket that Finn is wearing belongs to Poe. Rey assumes Finn to be a member of the Resistance after mentioning that BB-8 has a partially completed map leading to Luke. Finn goes along with her mistaken assumption, hoping that she will help him get BB-8 to the Resistance. The three of them escape the First Order on the Millennium Falcon with help from Han Solo (Harrison Ford) and Chewbacca (Peter Mayhew). Han takes them to his friend Maz Kanata (Lupita Nyong’o) on Takodana, who promises to take them to the Resistance. Finn decides to continue to flee the galactic conflict, but changes his mind when the First Order launches a preemptive strike on the capital of the New Republic and Ren's forces find them and take Rey prisoner.

Finn flies to the Resistance base, where he discovers that Poe is still alive and meets General Leia Organa (Carrie Fisher), C-3PO (Anthony Daniels), and the hibernating R2-D2 (Kenny Baker). Finn reveals some details about the First Order's superweapon, Starkiller Base, and claims to be able to disable their shields. When he arrives on the planet with Han and Chewbacca, however, Finn reveals that he only worked in the base's sanitation section. Nevertheless, the team takes Phasma hostage and Finn forces her at gunpoint to disable the shields. This allows the Resistance to attack, led by Poe. They meet up with Rey, who has freed herself from captivity. Later, Finn watches in horror with the others as Ren kills Han. Ren confronts Finn and Rey in the woods, claiming that their fight is not over. Finn picks up Luke’s old lightsaber after Rey is knocked out by Ren and tries to fight him, but Ren easily overpowers him and knocks him unconscious. Rey stops Ren from killing Finn, and she and Chewbacca escape Starkiller Base in the Millennium Falcon and bring the comatose Finn to the Resistance base for medical care.

Related works and merchandising
Finn is featured in Star Wars: Before the Awakening (2015) by Greg Rucka, an anthology book for young readers that focuses on the lives of Poe, Rey and Finn before the events of The Force Awakens. Finn is also a point of view character in the 2015 novelization of The Force Awakens by Alan Dean Foster.

Finn is a playable character in Disney Infinity 3.0, voiced by Boyega.

The Last Jedi
Finn awakens from his coma aboard the main Resistance cruiser, the MC85 Star Cruiser Raddus, and immediately demands to know where Rey is, learning that Leia has a beacon that will lead Rey back to her when necessary. Later, following the attack on the cruiser that killed most of the Resistance's main leadership and rendered Leia unconscious, Finn takes the beacon and attempts to board an escape pod in the hopes of keeping both himself and Rey out of danger. Before he can board the pod, he is found by Rose Tico (Kelly Marie Tran), a maintenance worker whose sister Paige, a bomber for the Resistance, has recently died in an attack on the First Order. Seeing Finn trying to escape, Rose stuns him and intends to turn him in for desertion, but stops when Finn tells her that the First Order has found a way to track the cruiser through lightspeed. She tells Finn that she might be able to disable the tracker, and Finn says that, having worked aboard a Star Destroyer, he would be able to find where the tracker is. Rose and Finn run their plan by Poe, who contacts Kanata for help, but she claims that she is too busy and instructs them to find a "master code breaker" in a casino in Canto Bight, a resort city on planet Cantonica. Operating against acting Resistance leader Vice Admiral Holdo’s (Laura Dern) wishes, Finn and Rose, along with BB-8, steal a ship and go to Canto Bight.

Finn is initially entranced by the lavish lifestyle of the casino, but becomes disillusioned when Rose tells him that most of the people there have become wealthy by dealing arms to the First Order. While they find the master code breaker, they are unable to recruit him as they are arrested and jailed for a parking violation. In their cell they meet DJ (Benicio Del Toro), a thief and codebreaker who offers to help them; they refuse, but he nonetheless breaks them out of their cell. Finn and Rose escape from the prison, where they set free a horde of horse-like racing creatures called Fathiers, escaping atop one of them. Outside the casino they are greeted by BB-8 and DJ, having stolen a ship together. DJ agrees to help them, despite Finn’s misgivings. Eventually, Finn, Rose, and DJ arrive aboard Supreme Leader Snoke's (Andy Serkis) flagship, the Mega-class Star Dreadnought Supremacy, and disguise themselves as First Order officers; Finn finds the location of the tracker and DJ breaks them in, but before Rose is able to disable the tracker they are caught by Phasma. Upon being captured, DJ, having overheard the Resistance's plan of escaping to Crait via transports, secretly tells the First Order of the plans in exchange for money and his freedom, and Finn and Rose are to be executed. Before they are, Holdo rams the Raddus into the Supremacy at lightspeed, damaging the Mega-Destroyer and sending it into chaos. Finn has a one-on-one fight with Phasma, ending with him proudly declaring himself "rebel scum" before Phasma falls to her demise. BB-8, aboard a First Order AT-ST, rescues Finn and Rose from Stormtroopers and the three of them very narrowly escape to Crait aboard a damaged shuttle.

As the First Order prepares an attack on the formerly abandoned Rebel base on Crait, Finn recognizes the weaponry that they plan to use to destroy the blast doors and leads a small strike on the First Order with the intention of disabling the cannon. The attack goes poorly, and Poe orders all fighters to retreat, but Finn is determined to destroy the cannon and flies directly into the blast, planning to sacrifice himself to defeat the First Order. At the last second, Rose stops him by ramming her speeder into his, pushing him out of the blast. Finn asks her why she stopped him, and she tells him that wars are won "not by fighting what we hate, but saving what we love;" she then kisses him before falling unconscious. Finn brings her body back to the Rebel base and summons a medic for her. When Luke appears on Crait, Finn's first instinct is to send forces to help him, but Poe realizes that Luke is stalling to give the Resistance time to escape. Finn and Poe lead the Resistance off the planet. Finn finally reunites with Rey and embraces her before boarding the Millennium Falcon. Finn is last seen putting a blanket over the still unconscious Rose.

Related works and merchandising
Finn is a playable Hero in Star Wars Battlefront II, voiced by Boyega. He was added through the DLC of The Last Jedi. Finn's outfit in The Rise of Skywalker update.

The Rise of Skywalker
Finn, along with Poe, intercepts a message from a First Order mole that Emperor Palpatine (Ian McDiarmid) has come back to life and is planning an attack on the free worlds in the form of the Final Order, a massive fleet of Xyston-class Star Destroyers built by the Sith Eternal. Finn then leaves along with Rey, Poe, C-3PO, and Chewbacca to the desert planet of Pasaana, where with the help of Lando Calrissian (Billy Dee Williams) they locate a dagger that contains a clue to a Sith wayfinder, a compass to the Sith planet Exegol. Throughout the whole journey, Finn clearly has something he wants to tell Rey, but is unable to find the time to tell her. Their journey takes them to Kijimi, where the location of the wayfinder is extracted from C-3PO's memory files, and later to the Resurgent-class Star Destroyer Steadfast, where Finn and Poe go to rescue Chewbacca, who was taken by the First Order. In the process, Finn and Poe are captured by Stormtroopers and set to be executed, but they are rescued by General Hux (Domnhall Gleeson), who reveals that he is the mole. Going free, Finn and Poe rescue Rey aboard the Millennium Falcon and head to the Endor system, where the wayfinder is located among the wreckage of the second Death Star.

On Kef Bir, they encounter a group allied with the Resistance, led by a woman named Jannah (Naomi Ackie). Finn gets to know Jannah, who reveals that she and the entire settlement on Kef Bir are former Stormtroopers who mutinied after a battle. Finn tells her that he left the First Order as well and suggests that the Force brought them together and caused them all to leave the Order. Finn and Jannah follow Rey aboard the wreckage to try and stop her from confronting Ren, but she does so and nearly kills him before healing him and leaving aboard Ren's ship. Without Rey or the wayfinder, Finn, Poe, and Jannah return to the Resistance base, where they learn that Leia has died. Poe is named Acting General, and Poe appoints Finn as Co-General.

Finn learns of Exegol's whereabouts based on Rey's transmissions, and he and Poe lead a strike against the Sith Eternal forces, including the Sith fleet, with Finn and Jannah specifically leading a ground attack on the surface of the Steadfast to take out their navigation. As the attack nears its end, Finn and Jannah are left on the surface of the damaged Resurgent Star Destroyer, but are ultimately rescued by Lando and Chewbacca in the Millennium Falcon and the rest of the Resistance fleet; Finn attributes his faith in his being rescued to a belief in the Force. Following the successful attack, Finn celebrates among the Rebels on the Resistance base, reuniting with Rey and Poe.

The Lego Star Wars Holiday Special
Finn, having revealed what he was going to tell Rey to be of his own realization of being Force sensitive, is now training under her as her Jedi Padawan. Rey accidentally hurts Finn's feelings during a training session, making Finn use a wooden toy lightsaber instead of her own. Rey seeks out a path leading her to the World Between Worlds, allowing her to travel through time. Meanwhile, Finn plans for Life Day celebrations with Poe, Jannah, Rose and Lando, as they await the arrival of Chewbacca's family. During her travels, Rey learns from Yoda's ghost that patience and understanding is an important part of teaching a Padawan; Finn is shown to have prevented the Life Day tree from falling by using his wooden lightsaber. When Rey returns home, she allows Finn to slice the Life Day roast with her lightsaber. By mistake, Finn slices all the way through the table, but Rey reassures him that she'll help him get better.

Character
When asked about Finn's character traits, Boyega replied, I think the element of having to step up to a bigger calling, when your circumstances don't particularly reflect that. Because I'm young, at the beginning of my life; you haven't really achieved much, and then you have to do that whole adulthood thing, get responsible, work and all of that stuff, no more mommy and daddy taking care of things. I feel like it's the same kind of journey that Finn has when he leaves the First Order. He leaves a curriculum, he leaves a system and embarks on his own journey. He also noted that initially "most of his decisions are based on adrenaline. Like, 'Okay, you know what? I'm just going to get this blaster and run away.' " Boyega further noted that "[n]ot only is the character in over his head and someone who is just dropped into an extraordinary circumstance, the scenes and the script prove that and it's not a problem that can just be erased."

Finn was originally going to be accompanied to Canto Bight by Poe in The Last Jedi, but writer/director Rian Johnson found the storyline flat when he realized their dialogue was interchangeable. This led to the creation of the character Rose Tico, who would challenge and contrast with Finn.

In The Rise of Skywalker, Finn tries to tell Rey something which he does not want to say in front of Poe, but this thread is never resolved within the film. This was implied to involve him confessing he loved her, but Boyega denied this on Twitter. The novelization of the film reveals that Finn is Force-sensitive, implying this to be what he intended to tell Rey. Abrams later confirmed that Finn was indeed Force-sensitive shortly after the film's premiere. The novelization also states that Rey believes this as well, speculating on the kind of Jedi he could become.

Reception
The character and Boyega's portrayal were praised; reviewer Jamie Graham wrote, "of the new triangle of characters, Boyega brings intensity and surprisingly honed comic timing." Reviewers also praised Finn's relationships with the other characters: The dynamic between Rey and Finn is something new for Star Wars, with her bright-eyed heroism complementing Boyega's roguish wit...Gone is the clunky dialogue of the prequels—instead, it's replaced by some seriously clever writing that often leads to nice little moments, many with Han and Finn. Drew McWeeny of HitFix notes, "Boyega has this great combination of self-interested fear and reluctant heroism that he plays beautifully, and he charts Finn's evolution as a person expertly here." Peter Travers of Rolling Stone described the character as "bracingly comic and cunning". Robbie Collin writes that Boyega has a "(very funny) half-brave, half-anxious, would-be-heroic schtick" and notes that despite being "brave, charming, and funny", Finn "only wants to be thought of as the daring freedom-fighter he's not quite sure he's cut out to be." Some reviewers were less than positive, however. Ty Burr of The Boston Globe wrote that "Boyega's Finn is the new movie's one weak link, a character who vacillates between noble impulses and cowardice until our interest drops away. The performance is fine but it's just fine, with little of the iconic bite a Wagnerian cartoon like this needs."

The character was also subject to racist reactions by some fans online, to which Boyega responded, "I'm not going to lose sleep over people." After the first trailer premiered, Boyega responded to critics with, "To whom it may concern ... Get used to it", and further commented that, "All the films I've done have had a secret commentary on stereotypical mentalities. It's about getting people to drop a prejudiced state of mind and realise, 'Oh shit we're just watching normal people.' " In response to those who desired to boycott the film over their disagreements with the existence of a black stormtrooper, Boyega replied, "I'm proud of my heritage, and no man can take that away from me. I wasn't raised to fear people with a difference of opinion. They are merely victims of a disease in their mind."

In 2016, Boyega was nominated for the Saturn Award for Best Actor for his portrayal of Finn.

Some criticized The Rise of Skywalker for its treatment of characters of color, including Finn. In January 2020, the working script for Episode IX by Colin Trevorrow and Derek Connolly, titled Star Wars: Duel of the Fates, was leaked. Some media sources argued that it gave characters like Finn more to do. In the script, Finn convinces stormtroopers to deflect the First Order and leads them into battle against it. Concept art of Finn's speech while holding a flag, as well as dialogue from the unmade film, were shared on social media and compared very positively and paralleling a speech given by Boyega during the 2020 Black Lives Matter protests. In September 2020, John Boyega publicly criticized The Last Jedi for sidelining characters played by people of color. In November 2020, he revealed that this led him to have a "very honest conversation" with Lucasfilm president Kathleen Kennedy, who supported his claims.

References

External links

 
 Finn on IMDb

Black characters in films
Film characters introduced in 2015
Fictional characters who committed sedition or treason
Fictional defectors
Fictional energy swordfighters
Fictional military personnel in films
Fictional revolutionaries
Fictional swordfighters
Fictional war veterans
Male characters in film
Fictional soldiers
Star Wars characters who are Force-sensitive
Star Wars Skywalker Saga characters
Star Wars video game characters